Rebecca "Becky" Griffin (Hebrew: רבקה "בקי" גריפין, born 27 December 1977) is an Israeli model, TV presenter and actress.

Early life
Rebecca (Becky) Griffin was born in Givatayim, Israel. Her mother, Ariela, was an accountant for the Steimatzky bookstore chain and is of Mizrahi Jewish (Yemenite-Jewish) descent. Her father, Bob Griffin, is an American who played for professional basketball teams in the Israeli Basketball Premier League in the 1970s, and is now an associate professor of English Literature. Her parents met at a bus stop in Israel.

She was first discovered in a commercial at the age of 11. By the time she was 20 she had already starred in several commercials and campaigns, and then got her first job in TV as a sports reporter on the Israeli Sport channel. She also hosted youth programs on Israel's Channel 1, and worked as a reporter in the "Erev Tov" show and in "In Out". Griffin also starred in the movie Matana Mi Shamayim, and has had guest appearances on several TV dramas.

Media and modelling career
On May 12, 2003, she become an MTV VJ on MTV Europe, and left the sports channel. Until 2005 Griffin stayed in Britain and appeared on the channel as the host of the Dance Floor Chart, the World Chart Express, and many Pan-Euro specials.

During her time in the UK, Griffin was chosen to star in the Nissan Micra Campaign all over Europe.

In December 2003, she was chosen to lead the campaign of the fashion chain "Castro".

She returned to Israel in 2005, and a year later enrolled as a Film & Television student at Tel-Aviv University, and was one of the leaders of the Student strike in 2007.

In 2008, Becky was the Euroleague Correspondent for Channel 10, and in 2010 hosted "Inside Israeli Basketball", a magazine that aired on several American cable stations.

In August 2011, Griffin brought international attention to the Nivea Cosmetics website for failing to list Israel as a country, while including the Palestinian territories. Griffin wrote a letter to Nivea which she publicized on her Facebook page, beginning a boycott of Nivea products. Conservative radio and TV personality Glenn Beck raised the issue on his radio show on the morning of August 4, 2011, and minutes later Nivea's site included Israel. That day, Nivea told BLAZE Magazine that the site for Israel was under construction and had therefore not been listed.

References

1977 births
Living people
Israeli expatriates in the United Kingdom
Israeli female models
Israeli people of American descent
Israeli people of Yemeni-Jewish descent
Israeli reporters and correspondents
Israeli television actresses
Jewish Israeli actresses
Jewish female models
People from Givatayim
Tel Aviv University alumni
VJs (media personalities)
Israeli Mizrahi Jews